Don Zimmerman (November 22, 1949 – May 11, 2020) was an American professional football player who was a wide receiver in the National Football League (NFL). Zimmerman was drafted in the 12th round of the 1972 NFL Draft by the Philadelphia Eagles. He played three seasons with the team before splitting his final season between the Eagles and the Green Bay Packers.

He died at age 70 on May 11, 2020.

References

External links
 

1949 births
2020 deaths
American football wide receivers
Arkansas–Pine Bluff Golden Lions football players
Green Bay Packers players
Louisiana–Monroe Warhawks football players
Philadelphia Eagles players
Players of American football from Louisiana
Sportspeople from Monroe, Louisiana